Men's Super-G competition at the 2009 World Championships.  The first men's race of the championships, the race was run on February 4.

Results

References
 FIS-ski.com - official results
 Ski Racing.com - Worlds: Cuche is super G champion - 04-Feb-2009

Men's super-G